Gymnothorax formosus is a moray eel found in the western central Pacific Ocean. It was first named by Pieter Bleeker in 1864.

References

formosus
Fish described in 1864